Pleuromeia dubia is a tall species for the genus, with distinctive elongate leaf scars, and known from the Early Triassic of Australia and South Africa. Like other species of Pleuromeia it was a survivor of the marked greenhouse spike at the end of the Early Triassic.

See also 
 Evolution of plants

References 

Triassic plants
Prehistoric lycophytes